The Atlantic trumpetfish, Aulostomus strigosus (or incorrectly Atlantic coronetfish) is a species of trumpetfish in the family Aulostomidae. It is a tropical marine fish found in shallow coastal waters in the eastern Atlantic Ocean from Mauritania to Namibia. Like other trumpetfish, they eat mainly small fish and often shadow other piscivores while hunting.

Aulostomus strigosus was found to be very closely related to Aulostomus maculatus, strongly supporting the theory that A. strigosus traversed the Atlantic to come to inhabit the Southeast Pacific.

Description
Trumpetfish are long bodied fish with an upward facing mouth at the end of a long tubular snout.

It has the ability to change colour, either to communicate their excitement or to camouflage them. The most frequent colours recorded are brown or even blue, green or orange tones, or intermediate shades. It can display a pattern of pale, vertical and / or horizontal lines, or a dark mottling on the body. The dorsal and anal fins are semitransparent with a black dot in front of it. Typically it has a pattern of four white spots on the body, between the dorsal and anal fins; three white vertical lines in the long caudal peduncle and a black, submarginal, in each margin of the caudal fin dot.

It reaches a maximum length of 75 cm.

Habitat and Behaviour
Aulostomus strigosus is a demersal, coastal species that is found over rocky or coral substrates in inshore waters. Its main prey is fish  but is also thought feed on animals found on the substrate. A. strigosus is also considered a "follower" fish in that it will swim with schools of other species of fish, especially large, herbivorous fishes, for both protection and to exploit foraging opportunities. When hunting smaller prey trumpetfish will hang vertically in the water column, head pointed downwards, striking at prey when the opportunity arises.

Like many fish, trumpetfishes have an elaborate courtship display,  in which they employ their colour-changing abilities, so often used for camouflage.

A. strigosus are frequent prey of ospreys Pandion haliaetus in Cape Verde Islands and possibly elsewhere within their range.

Distribution

The warmer waters of the eastern Atlantic from Namibia to Mauritania, it is also found in the Macaronesian Islands including Madeira, Cape Verde Islands and the Canary Islands. The species has also been recorded in Brazil in Espirito Santo and St. Paul's rocks, but these may be misidentification of A. maculatus.

Gallery

References

External links
 

Atlantic trumpetfish
Fish of the Atlantic Ocean
Fauna of Macaronesia
Atlantic trumpetfish